Drygalski Glacier is a broad glacier,  long and  wide at its head, which flows from Herbert Plateau southeast between Ruth Ridge and Kyustendil Ridge, and enters Solari Bay  immediately north of Sentinel Nunatak on Nordenskjöld Coast, the east coast of Graham Land, Antarctica. It was discovered in 1902 by the Swedish Antarctic Expedition, under Otto Nordenskiöld, and named "Drygalski Bay" after Professor Erich von Drygalski. The feature was determined to be a glacier by the Falkland Islands Dependencies Survey in 1947.

See also
 List of glaciers in the Antarctic
 Glaciology

References 

 SCAR Composite Antarctic Gazetteer.

Glaciers of Nordenskjöld Coast